Pier Cloruro de' Lambicchi is an Italian comic strip series created by Giovanni Manca.

Background 
Pier Cloruro de' Lambicchi debuted in the children magazine Il Corriere dei Piccoli in 1930. The comics strip ended publications in the late 1940s, then briefly resurfaced in 1967 in the comics magazine Il Giorno dei Ragazzi. 

The title character of the comics is a scientist who created in his ramshackle laboratory a special paint, called "arcivernice", which has the unique property of giving life to the characters depicted in the paintings and drawings.

References 

Italian comic strips
Italian comics titles
Italian comics characters
Comic strips ended in the 1960s
1930 comics debuts
Humor comics
Fictional scientists in comics
Fictional Italian people
Comics characters introduced in 1930
Male characters in comics